Alice Blanchard is an American award-winning suspense novelist  whose slogan is“My goal is to write fiction that marries the sweeping scope of the thriller with the more personal epiphany of the short story.” and she won the Katherine Anne Porter Prize for Fiction for her book of stories, The Stuntman's Daughter.

Works
Her first novel, Darkness Peering, was named one of the New York Times' Notable Books, a Barnes & Noble Best Mystery, and a Book Sense Pick. Her thriller, The Breathtaker, was an official selection of the NBC Today Book Club. Alice has received a PEN Syndicated Fiction Award, a New Letters Literary Award, and a Centrum Artists in Residence Fellowship. Her books have been published in 17 countries. 

Film rights have been optioned to Anonymous Content and John Wells Productions. Minotaur Books at St. Martin's Press will publish the first of two novels in the Natalie Lockhart series. Trace of Evil follows a female rookie detective investigating the murder of a popular high school teacher that has eerie ties to the murder of a teenage girl 20 years ago. The series will unearth an even darker story involving a history of witch accusation and obsession with black magic deep in the woods of the idyllic suburban community of Burning Lake, New York.

Selected works 
 The Stuntman's Daughter: And Other Stories (1996) 
 Darkness Peering (1999)
 The Breathtaker (2003)
 Life Sentences (2005)
 A Breath After Drowning (2018)
 THE Natalie  Lockhart  Series(book 1-4)

Natalie Lockhart series
 Trace of Evil (2019)
The Wicked Hour (2021)

References

External links
 Official website

Living people
American thriller writers
People from Middletown, Connecticut
American women short story writers
Novelists from Connecticut
Women thriller writers
American women novelists
21st-century American women writers
20th-century American women writers
21st-century American novelists
20th-century American novelists
20th-century American short story writers
Year of birth missing (living people)